Red Force or Red force may refer to

Red Force FC, an amateur soccer team based in Miami, Florida
Red team, also known as a red force, an independent group that challenges an organization to improve its effectiveness
Red Force (roller coaster), a roller coaster at the Ferrari Land theme park in Tarragona, Spain